There are a number of unincorporated communities in Eau Claire County, Wisconsin.  These fall into four basic types:
Historical communities (no longer in existence) (†), some remain as ghost towns (‡)
Former communities since annexed into larger municipalities (*)
Modern-day small communities, too small to consider incorporation (§)
Modern-day areas recognized as census-designated places by the United States Census Bureau (°)

Arranged here as they fall within present-day divisions of Eau Claire County, these are:

City of Altoona
none, although the original settlement was named East Eau Claire 
City of Augusta
none
Town of Bridge Creek
Hay Creek
Kempton
Town of Brunswick
Candy Corners
Lufkin
Mount Hope Corners
Porter's Mills‡
Town of Clear Creek
Allen§
Foster§
Nix Corner
Norseville
Otter Creek
Town of Drammen
Anthony
Nelsonville‡
Oak Grove‡
City of Eau Claire
Half Moon* (This was a town)
Magenta*
Pinehurst*
Putnam Heights*
Shawtown*
Truax*
Union*
West Eau Claire*
Village of Fairchild
none
Town of Fairchild
none
Village of Fall Creek
none
Town of Lincoln
Rodell
Rosedale (Some sources claim this is an older name for Rodell, but maps such as this seem to indicate it was actually about 3 miles northwest of Rodell)
Town of Ludington
Ludington§
Town of Otter Creek
Hale Corner
Town of Pleasant Valley
Cleghorn§
Hadleyville†
Shaw (Not to be confused with Shawtown, now within the city of Eau Claire)
Town of Seymour
Seymour°
Town of Union
Truax
Union
Town of Washington
Brackett§
Town of Wilson
Wilson§

Maps
LiveGen map from 1895 atlas
KinQuest map from 1901 atlas
Census info

Notes

 
Unincorporated communities Eau Clair